The Connecticut Open is the Connecticut state open golf tournament, open to both amateur and professional golfers. It is organized by the Connecticut State Golf Association. It has been played annually since 1931 (except for war years) at a variety of courses around the state. It was considered a PGA Tour event in the 1930s.

History 
In 1915 and 1916 there was a significant golf event entitled the Connecticut Open. The English golfer Jim Barnes won it both years. In the 1920s, there was talk of renewing the event. In 1930, an event entitled the Connecticut Open was scheduled to be hosted on September 13 and 14. The event was scheduled to be held at Shenecossett Club. However, it failed to receive "sanction" from the Connecticut Golf Association. The event was canceled by September 3. It was also reported during late 1930 that the Connecticut Golf Association was planning on sanctioning an official state open in the summer of 1931. 

The first Connecticut Open sanctioned by the Connecticut Golf Association was held in 1931. Eighty players entered in the first tournament. The event was two rounds long and played over one day at Yale Golf Course. Playing against "a light rain" and "a strong, chilly wind," as reported by The New York Times, Henry Ciuci managed to score 152 to win. He defeated Jack Ryan, the assistant professional at Yale GC, by two shots. A number of players finished one shot further back to tie for third, including amateur Charles Clare. As low amateur, he earned a silver plate. Ciuci won $250 and the right to hold a Connecticut Golf Association shield for a year. For most of the early years of the Connecticut Open, however, it was the professional Johnny Golden that dominated. Golden won four consecutive tournaments from 1932 through 1935. However, in January 1936 he abruptly died of pneumonia. Later in the year, Leo Mallory, Golden's former assistant at Wee Burn, won the Connecticut Open with 283 total. It was the lowest total since the tournament switched from a two-round tournament to a four-round tournament. The following year, at Wampanoag Country Club, he won by 10 shots, another tournament record. In 1941, Jimmy Demaret, who won the Masters the previous year, won the Connecticut Open. The tournament was not held until 1946 due to World War II.

Former PGA Tour pro Mike Colandro won the event in 1986. Despite his win, he advocated some changes to the tournament. According to the Hartford Courant, shortly after his victory "he called for the sponsoring Connecticut State Golf Association to open the event to all state pros, get a sponsor and increase the $10,000 purse."

In 1997, PGA Tour player Ken Green played the event. Many were surprised to see a current PGA Tour player in the field. He explained, "I don't really want to be here, but I don't have any choice. I have a negative net worth."

Winners

Source:

See also
Connecticut Open (1910s event)
New Haven Open

References

External links
Connecticut State Golf Association

Former PGA Tour events
Golf in Connecticut
State Open golf tournaments
Recurring sporting events established in 1931
1931 establishments in Connecticut
Sports competitions in Connecticut